A Man's Thoughts is the sixth studio album from American R&B singer Ginuwine. It was set to be released June 2 but was pushed back to June 23, 2009. The album received average critical reception from pop critics.

Release
The first single from the album is "Last Chance", which was produced by Bryan-Michael Cox and written by Adonis Shropshire. The single speaks about a man's plea for one last chance to prove his love. "'Last Chance' reflects the maturity of my personal growth over the last few years," explains the singer. A video for the single was recently shot in Los Angeles and will feature appearances from singer Tyrese and actress LisaRaye. It was directed by Juwan Lee, who has also done work with Mario, Nelly and Young Capone.

"Last Chance" was released to Urban AC radio on March 3 and was released to mainstream urban markets on March 24. On March 26, on 106 & Park, Ginuwine stated that his second single will feature Missy Elliott and describe to album as a sort of reunion. He also stated that he had not spoken to Timbaland within 5 years, because they simply grew apart.

Despite "Get Involved" being listed as the second single for the album, the track "Trouble" featuring Bun B was the second music video to be shot and released. The music video was done for the version of the track that did not feature Bun B. The official remix of "Trouble" features Hurricane Chris, Gucci Mane, & OJ Da Juiceman.

Critical reception

A Man's Thoughts was met with "mixed or average" reviews from critics. At Metacritic, which assigns a weighted average rating out of 100 to reviews from mainstream publications, this release received an average score of 53 based on 10 reviews. In a review for AllMusic, critic reviewer Andy Kellman called he album "a decent set of modern R&B, dominated by seductive slow jams, that stimulates a little more often than it fades into the background. It does take a serious tone on a handful of songs dealing in a wider range of relationship issues than lust, heartache, and devotion." Similarly, Steve Jones from USA Today found that "Ginuwine has always been a smooth purveyor of steamy slow jams, but here the sex involves more emotional entanglement, and that can lead to complications [...] The simmering tempo is interrupted only by the percolating "Get Involved," which reunites him with early mentors Timbaland and Missy Elliott. It's like a sunny commercial break in the middle, before regular programming resumes."

The Boston Heralds Lauren Carter called A Man's Thoughts "a sultry collection of body-worshiping, bedroom-centric tales [...] But this is not the same ol’ G. Though he reunites with former cohorts Timbaland and Missy Elliott [...] Ginuwine has traded in the synth burps and stuttering percussion for a mature sound that mixes contemporary with quiet storm. Yes, his vocals still burn, but the total package has lost some sizzle." Mikael Wood from The Los Angeles Times argued that "the vocals are fine. In fact, their relatively rough-hewn humanity is kind of refreshing in the Age of Auto-Tune. But with only a few exceptions [...] the material here doesn't live up to his performances, making the music easier to admire than to enjoy." Entertainment Weeklys Simon Vozick-Levinson remarked that "a handful of uptempo highlights aside, the rest of the disc turns out to be an unduly generous helping of syrupy bedroom pleas that'll have you wishing Ginuwine had decided to keep some of those Thoughts to himself." Tyler Lewis  from PopMatters found that A Man's Thoughts "continues the uneven work" Ginuwine's had been doing since 2001. He critiqued the singer for replacing himself "with the latest trendy producers" and noted that "as a result, very few songs on the album stand out."

Chart performance
The album debuted at number nine on the Billboard 200, selling 38,000 units in its first week.

Track listing

Notes
 denotes a co-producer

Charts

Weekly charts

Year-end charts

Release history

References

External links
 
 Album preview at Amazon.com

2009 albums
Ginuwine albums
Albums produced by Bryan-Michael Cox
Albums produced by Timbaland
Albums produced by Maejor
Albums produced by Oak Felder